Frank Charles Moore (March 23, 1896 – April 23, 1978) was a Canadian-born American lawyer and politician who served as the 48th New York State Comptroller.

Early life and education 
Moore was born in Toronto, Ontario, in 1896. When he was 11-months-old, his parents moved to Buffalo, New York, where he was raised. Moore attended Hobart College and earned a law degree from the University at Buffalo Law School.

Military service 
During World War I, Moore served in the Royal Canadian Air Force, Royal Flying Corps and United States Army. He was discharged in 1917 for being underweight.

Career
Moore was a delegate to the New York State Constitutional Conventions of 1938 and 1967. He was the New York State Comptroller from 1943 to 1950, elected in 1942 and 1946.

At the 1950 New York state election, he was elected Lieutenant Governor of New York and took office on January 1, 1951. He resigned on September 30, 1953, to become president of Nelson A. Rockefeller's Government Affairs Foundation.

Death 
Moore died on April 23, 1978, in Crystal River, Florida. He was buried at Elmlawn Cemetery in Kenmore, New York.

Sources

Moore, E to F at Political Graveyard
 His resignation announced, in Time magazine on May 4, 1953.

Lieutenant Governors of New York (state)
Canadian emigrants to the United States
New York State Comptrollers
1896 births
1978 deaths
New York (state) Republicans
People from Kenmore, New York
Politicians from Toronto
20th-century American politicians